The 2015–16 San Diego State men's basketball team represented San Diego State University during the 2015–16 NCAA Division I men's basketball season. This was head coach Steve Fisher's seventeenth season at San Diego State. The Aztecs played their home games at Viejas Arena. They were members in the Mountain West Conference. They finished the season 28–10, 16–2 in Mountain West play to win the Mountain West regular season championship. They defeated Utah State and Nevada to advance to the championship game of the Mountain West tournament where they lost to Fresno State. As a regular season conference champion who failed to win their conference tournament, received an automatic bid to the National Invitation Tournament where they defeated IPFW, Washington, and Georgia Tech to advance to the semifinals where they lost to George Washington.

Previous season
The 2014–15 San Diego State Aztecs finished the season with an overall record of 27–9, and 14–4 in Mountain West play to finish in a tie for the Mountain West regular season championship with Boise State. They advanced to the championship game of the Mountain West tournament where they lost to Wyoming. They received an at-large bid to the NCAA tournament as an 8-seed in the South Region, where they defeated St. John's in the second round before losing in the Round of 32 to Duke.

Departures

2015 recruiting class
In addition to two high school recruits, San Diego State received a commitment from Indiana transfer Max Hoetzel. The sophomore wing will sit out the 2015–16 season, after which he will have three years of remaining eligibility.

Roster

Schedule

|-
!colspan=9 style="background:#C23038; color:#231F20;"| Exhibition

|-
!colspan=9 style="background:#C23038; color:#231F20;"| Non-conference regular season

|-
!colspan=9 style="background:#C23038;"| Mountain West regular season

|-
!colspan=9 style="background:#C23038; color:#231F20;"| Mountain West tournament

|-
!colspan=9 style="background:#C23038; color:#231F20;"| NIT

References

San Diego State Aztecs men's basketball seasons
San Diego State
San Diego State